Skontorp Cove is a cove in Paradise Harbor, lying 2 nautical miles (3.7 km) southeast of Bryde Island along the west coast of Graham Land. Named for Edvard Skontorp, an outstanding Norwegian whale gunner, who commanded a whaler for Salvesen and Co. of Leith, Scotland.

References 

Coves of Graham Land
Danco Coast